Seversky (masculine), Severskaya (feminine), or Severskoye (neuter) is the name of several inhabited localities in Russia.

Modern rural localities
Seversky, Krasnodar Krai, a khutor in Penisiev Rural Okrug of Ust-Labinsky District of Krasnodar Krai
Severskoye, Russia, a selo in Raduzhnoye Rural Settlement of Kolomensky District of Moscow Oblast
Severskaya, a stanitsa in Seversky Rural Okrug of Seversky District of Krasnodar Krai

Abolished localities
Seversky, Sverdlovsk Oblast, a former urban-type settlement in Sverdlovsk Oblast; since 1942—a part of the town of Polevskoy

See also
Seversk, a closed city in Tomsk Oblast